Wolany  is a village in the administrative district of Gmina Szczytna, within Kłodzko County, Lower Silesian Voivodeship, in south-western Poland.

Notable residents
 Duchess Amelia of Württemberg (1799–1848)

References

Wolany